Leonid Aleksandrovich Vesnin (Леони́д Александрович Веснин; 28 November [O.S. 10 December] 1880 – 8 October 1933), was a Russian and Soviet architect. The oldest of Vesnin brothers, who were influential in developing Constructivist architecture.

Biography 
Leonid Aleksandrovich was born on 28 November [O.S. 10 December] 1880 in a merchant family in Nizhny Novgorod. He went to Moscow Practical Academy of Commercial Sciences from 1890 to 1899. In 1900 he got into Imperial Academy of Arts and was a student of Leon Benois until he graduated in 1909.

Selected work

1934 People's Commissariat of Heavy Industry Project
1930 Palace of Culture of the Proletarskie district, Moscow
1928 House of Film Actors, Moscow
1926 Mostorg Department store, Moscow
1924 Leningradskaya Pravda project
1922-23 Palace of Labor project

Notes

External links

Leonid Alexandrovich Vesnin, photographs, Canadian Centre for Architecture (digitized items)

1880 births
1933 deaths
Academic staff of Bauman Moscow State Technical University
Recipients of the Order of the Red Banner of Labour
Architects from the Russian Empire
Constructivist architects
Modernist architects
Russian architects
Russian avant-garde

Soviet architects
Soviet urban planners
Burials at Novodevichy Cemetery